Homer Roberts may refer to:

Homer B. Roberts,  first black person to attain the rank of lieutenant in the United States Army Signal Corps
Homer Roberts (The OA), fictional character